Lophotavia incivilis is a moth of the family Erebidae. It is found in Somalia, Eritrea, Madagascar and Mauritius.

The adults have a wingspan of 35 mm.

References

Calpinae
Moths of Madagascar
Moths of Mauritius
Moths of Africa
Insects of Somalia
Insects of Eritrea